Maggs is a surname. Notable people with the surname include:

Adriana Maggs, Canadian actress
Albert H. Maggs (1916–1994), Australian bookmaker
Arnaud Maggs (1926–2012), Canadian artist
Bruce Maggs, American computer scientist
Christine Maggs (born 1956), British phycologist
Colin G. Maggs, English railway historian
Daniel Maggs (born 1968), South African architect and artist
Darryl Maggs (born 1949), Canadian ice hockey player
Dirk Maggs (born 1955), English radio producer
Don Maggs (born 1961), American football player
Ellen Maggs (born 1983), English football player
Gregory E. Maggs (born 1964), American judge and lawyer
Jeremy Maggs (born 1961), South African television presenter
Joey Maggs (1969–2006), American wrestler
John Maggs (1819–1896), English painter
Kevin Maggs (born 1974), Irish rugby union player
Randall Maggs, Canadian poet
Sam Maggs (born 1988), Canadian-American author
Tony Maggs (1937–2009), South African racing driver
Uriah Maggs (1828–1913), English antiquarian bookseller

See also
Albert H. Maggs Composition Award, an Australian classical music award
Maggs Bros Ltd, a British antiquarian bookseller
Jack Maggs, a 1997 novel by Peter Carey
Magg

Surnames of English origin